Viasat was a satellite and pay television brand, co-owned by the Swedish media group Viaplay Group in the Nordic countries, Antenna Group in Hungary, and by Viasat World internationally. Founded in Sweden in 1991, Viasat has previously been owned by Modern Times Group. The channels of both companies were broadcast from London. 

In 2020 Viasat formed a joint venture with Canal Digital to form the company Allente. The merger was completed on April 13, 2021.

Satellite platforms 
The Viasat signals was received from the Astra 4A and SES-5 satellites at 4.8°E with any DVB-S receiver equipped with a NDS VideoGuard descrambling module.
Viasat does not have a platform of their own outside the Nordic and Baltic countries, so they have to rely on third party distributors in Eastern and Central Europe.

In May 2016, MTG announced the launch of Viasat Ultra HD, the first ultra-high-definition television (UHD) channel in the Nordic region and its first UHD Sports channel. The channel will feature selected live sport events especially produced in Ultra HD and launch in the autumn in Sweden, Norway, Denmark and Finland via SES-5. Viasat will also be launching an Ultra HD set-top box from Samsung and a TV-module to enable existing UHD TVs to display the channel.

TV channels

Nordic countries
The Nordic Viasat-branded operations are owned by Viaplay Group. The brand is no longer used for the advertising-funded and free-to-air channels of Viaplay Group.

V Film and V Series
V Film and V Series channels are common for the four Nordic markets.
 V Film Premiere
 V Film Action
 V Film Hits
 V Film Family
 V Series

Sports
The available sports television channels differ across the Nordic markets due to the varying broadcasting rights. In Denmark most of the Viaplay-owned sports channels use the brand TV3 (TV3 Sport and TV3 Max).

V Sport Ultra HD (Sweden, Finland, Norway, Denmark)
V Sport Golf (Sweden, Finland, Norway, Denmark)
V Sport Live 1-5 (Sweden, Finland, Norway, Denmark)
V Sport 1 (Sweden, Finland, Norway)
V Sport Extra (Sweden)
V Sport Premium (Sweden and Finland)
V Sport Football (Sweden and Finland)
V Sport Vinter (Sweden and Finland)
V Sport Motor (Sweden and Finland)
V Sport Premier League (Norway)
V Sport Premier League 1-4 (Norway)
V Sport+ (Norway)
V Sport 2 (Norway)
V Sport 3 (Norway)
V Sport+ Suomi (Finland)
V Sport 1 Suomi (Finland)
V Sport 2 Suomi (Finland)

International channels 
Owned by Viasat World.

Pay channels:
Viasat Nature
Viasat Explore
Viasat History
Epic Drama
Viasat Kino (previously TV1000 East)
Viasat Kino Action (previously TV1000 Action East)
Viasat Kino World (previously TV1000 World Kino)
Viasat Kino Megahit (previously ViP Megahit East)
Viasat Kino Comedy (previously ViP Comedy East)

Pay channels in Russia and Central Asia (owned by Viasat Russia):
Viju Nature (previously Viasat Nature)
Viju Explore (previously Viasat Explore)
Viju History (previously Viasat History)
Viju TV1000 (previously TV1000)
Viju TV1000 Action (previously TV1000 Action)
Viju TV1000 Russkoe (previously TV1000 Russkoe Kino)
Viju+ Megahit (previously ViP Megahit)
Viju+ Comedy (previously ViP Comedy)
Viju+ Premiere (previously ViP Premiere)
Viju+ Serial (previously ViP Serial)
Viju+ Planet (previously Viasat Nature/History HD)
Viju+ Sport (previously Viasat Sport)

Hungary 
Owned by Antenna Group.

Pay channels:
AXN Hungary
Viasat 2 Hungary
Viasat 3 Hungary
Viasat 6 Hungary
Viasat Film Hungary

DBS Channels 
In addition to their own channels, Viasat carry several third-party channels on their platform.

Country specific 

Sweden:
SVT1 (also in HD)
SVT2 (also in HD)
SVT24 (timesharing with Barnkanalen)
SVT Barnkanalen (timesharing with SVT24)
Kunskapskanalen
TV4
Sjuan
TV4 Film
TV4 Fakta
TV4 Science fiction
TV4 Sport
TV4 Komedi
TV4 Guld
TV4 News
Kanal 5 
Kanal 9
Kanal 11
TNT
MTV Sweden
Nickelodeon Sweden
Comedy Central Sweden

Denmark:
DR1
DR2
DR3 (HD)
DR K
DR Ramasjang
DR Ultra
TV 2 Denmark
TV 2 Charlie
TV 2 Film
TV 2 News
TV 2 Zulu
Kanal 4
Kanal 5
6'eren
7'eren
24 Nordjyske
MTV Denmark

Norway:
NRK1
NRK2
NRK3/NRK Super
TV 2 Norge
TV 2 Filmkanalen
TV 2 Nyhetskanalen
TV 2 Sport
TV3 (Norway)
TVNorge
FEM
MAX
VOX
MTV Norway

Slovakia:
RTVS

Lithuania:
Lietuvos Rytas TV
LRT Televizija
LRT Lituanica
LNK
TV1
BTV
Sport1

Transnational

Animal Planet Europe (only in the Baltics)
BBC World News
Cartoon Network (6.00-21.00, time-sharing with TCM Europe)
CNBC Nordic
CNN International
Discovery Channel Europe (only in the Baltics)
Disney Channel Scandinavia
E!
Euronews
Boomerang (Nordic) (launched on 30 September 2010 as a 24-hour channel)
The God Channel
MTV Live HD
Nat Geo Scandinavia 
Nat Geo HD
Nat Geo Wild
Nickelodeon Scandinavia (6.00-18.00, time-sharing with VH1 Europe)
Nick Jr. (Sweden)
NHK World
NTV Mir (only in the Baltics)
Playboy TV (time-sharing with Viasat Nature/Crime)
Disney Junior Scandinavia (time-sharing with Viasat Film Drama)
Ren TV (only in the Baltics)
RTR Planeta (only in Estonia and Lithuania)
RT
Spice Platinum (time-sharing with Viasat Explorer)
Spice Private (also known as Viasat Ticket 2 Erotic)
STS International (only in the Baltics)
Disney XD Scandinavia (defunct in December 31, 2020)
TCM Nordic (Turner Classic Movies) (21.00-6.00, time-sharing with Cartoon Network Nordic)
VH1 Europe (18.00-6.00, time-sharing with Nick Jr Sweden)
CBS Reality
MTV Europe
Penthouse HD1
Penthouse HD2
Space Channel 3D

Former channels

World record 

The live 3D broadcast of the 2011 UEFA Champions League final match between Manchester United and Barcelona was provided by Viasat in 3D format in Gothenburg (Sweden). The football match was broadcast on EKTA screen. This Ukrainian produced 3D LED TV made The Guinness Book of World Records.

See also 
List of Danish television channels
List of Estonian television channels
List of Finnish television channels
List of Latvian television channels
List of Lithuanian television channels
List of Norwegian television channels
List of Swedish television channels

External links
Viasat World
Viasat Sverige
Viasat Danmark
Viasat Norge
Viasat Suomi

References 

Mass media companies established in 1991
2020 mergers and acquisitions 
Mass media companies disestablished in 2021
Direct broadcast satellite services
Television in Sweden
Television in Denmark
Television in Finland
Television broadcasting companies of Norway
Television networks in Sweden

Broadcasting in the United Kingdom
Local mass media in London